There are at least 11 named lakes and reservoirs in Drew County, Arkansas.

Lakes
 Austin Brake, el.  
 Big Lake, el.

Reservoirs
 Bynum Lake, el.  
 Byrd Lake, el.  
 Dura Craft Lake, el.  
 Hopper Pond, el.  
 Lake Wallace, el.  
 Marsh Lake, el.  
 Seven Devils Lake, el.  
 Seven Devils Swamp, el.  
 Wells Lake, el.

See also

 List of lakes in Arkansas

Notes

Bodies of water of Drew County, Arkansas
Drew